Magda Balsam (born 20 September 1996) is a Polish handballer for JKS Jarosław and the Polish national team.

She participated at the 2021 World Women's Handball Championship in Spain, placing 15th.

Achievements
Ekstraklasa:
Bronze Medalist: 2020

References

External links

1996 births
Living people
People from Sztum
Polish female handball players
21st-century Polish women